Marcel Kunz (24 May 1943 – 22 July 2017) was a Swiss footballer who played as a goalkeeper.

Club career
Born in Gerlafingen, Kunz started his football with the youth teams of the local football club FC Gerlafingen before moving on to Basel in 1963. He came to Basel as second goalkeeper behind Kurt Stettler, who had been their goalkeeper since 1957 and who stayed first goalkeeper until 1965. Kunz played his debut for Basel on 8 September 1963 in the 1-0 away win against Grenchen. Although he broke his arm in April 1964 during the match against Schaffhausen, Kunz was Basels number one goalkeeper for twelve years, despite having strong competition from Jean-Paul Laufenburger for the place between the posts in the Basel Nationalliga A team.

Kunz won the Swiss championship title for the first time in Basel's 1966–67 season. Basel finished the championship one point clear of FC Zürich who finished in second position. Basel won 16 of the 26 games, drawing eight, losing twice, and they scored 60 goals conceding just 20.

In that season Kunz won the double with Basel. In the Cup final on 15 May 1967 Basel's opponents were Lausanne-Sports. In the former Wankdorf Stadium, Helmut Hauser scored the decisive goal via penalty. The game went down in football history due to the sit-down strike that followed this goal. After 88 minutes of play, with the score at 1–1, referee Karl Göppel awarded Basel a controversial penalty. André Grobéty had pushed Hauser gently in the back and Hauser let himself drop theatrically. Subsequently, after the 2–1 lead for Basel the Lausanne players refused to resume the game and they sat down demonstratively on the pitch. The referee had to abandon the match. Basel were awarded the cup with a 3–0 forfait.

Kunz won his second title in Basel's 1968–69 season. Basel finished the championship just one point clear of second placed Lausanne Sports. Basel won 13 of the 26 games, drawing ten, losing three times, they scored 48 goals conceding 28. Kunz won the championship with Basel for the third time season 1969–70. The team again finished one point clear of Lausanne Sports who ended in second position. Basel won 15 of the 26 games, drawing seven, losing four times, they scored 59 goals conceding 23. In 1971–72 Kunz won the championship for the fourth time. Basel ended the season four points ahead of Zürich. Of the 26 league games Basel won 18, drawing seven, losing just once, scoring 66 goals conceding 28. Kunz won the Swiss championship title for the fifth time in the 1972–73 Nationalliga A season. Basel won the championship four points ahead of Grasshopper Club. Basel won 17 of their 26 league games, drew five and lost four. They scored a total of 57 goals conceding 30.

Kunz won the Swiss Cup for the second time in the 1974–75 season as Basel beat Winterthur 2–1 after extra time. He played a total of 283 matches for Basel, including championship, Swiss Cup, Fairs Cup, UEFA Cup and European Cup.

After his career with FC Basel Kunz played another year by Nordstern Basel in the Nationalliga B.

International career
Kunz was called up by trainers Alfredo Foni and Erwin Ballabio into the Switzerland national football team as successor to Karl Elsener. He played his debut for Switzerland on 24 May 1967 in the Hardturm, in Zürich, in front of 21,337 spectators in the legendary 7–1 win against Romania. He was capped a total of 14 times for Switzerland.

He played his last game for his country on 13 October 1971 in St. Jakob Stadium, in front of 47,877 spectators, under coach Louis Maurer. The Euro 1972 qualifying game ended with a 2–3 defeat against England.

Honours
Basel
 Swiss League champions: 1966–67, 1968–69, 1969–70, 1971–72, 1972–73
 Swiss Cup winner: 1966–67, 1974–75
 Swiss Cup runner-up: 1969–70, 1971–72, 1972–73
 Swiss League Cup winner: 1972
 Coppa delle Alpi winner: 1969, 1970
 Uhren Cup winner: 1969, 1970

Personal life
Even to his playing times Kunz was employee of Ankerbrauerei a brewery in Frenkendorf. The Ankerbrauerei was taken over by Feldschlösschen and after his football career Kunz devoted himself entirely to his profession as sales representative for the Feldschlösschen AG. Up until his retirement, Kunz remained faithful to the brewery in Rheinfelden. In 1968 Kunz married Sylvia Dienst, a daughter of the legendary referee Gottfried Dienst. They had two children, daughter Corinne and son Sascha, and they lived in Riehen bei Basel which, until his death, remained the home of the Kunz family.

In July 2017 FC Basel announced that their former goalkeeper had died on 22 July 2017 in the Basler Clara Hospital after a long illness.

References

Sources
 Rotblau: Jahrbuch Saison 2015/2016. Publisher: FC Basel Marketing AG. 
 A list of Swiss Cup Finals at RSSSF

1943 births
2017 deaths
Association football goalkeepers
Swiss men's footballers
Switzerland international footballers
Swiss Super League players
FC Basel players
FC Nordstern Basel players
Sportspeople from the canton of Solothurn
People from Riehen
Footballers from Basel